Lushnjë (in Lushnje's own dialect: Lushnje) is a city and municipality in west-central Albania. It is located in the County of Fier.

History 

In January 1920, Lushnje was a provisional capital of Albania and the place of the Congress of Lushnje. Chieftains of Albania assembled in the town and declared Tirana first a provisional and then the definitive capital of Albania.

3 km away from Lushnjë is the Savra Field. This field is on the Lushnjë-Fier road. Here the first battle between Principality of Zeta and Ottoman Empire occurred in 1385 (the Battle of Savra). 
In this battle Balsha II was killed. 
Along with Fier, Lushnjë was the main district of the concentration camps during the Communist Regime; some of the camps included the villages of Savër, Gradishtë, Bedat, Gjazë, Rrapëz, Plug, etc.

Geography 

Lushnje is in a hot Mediterranean summer type of climate. Lushnje is in the middle plains and flatland. This land is used for growing crops and raising animals. It is 30 km to Divjakë-Karavasta National Park with wetland and beaches and a lagoon. There is a Reservoir in a village in Kashar, Lushnje with many farmlands around it and a connecting canal known as Perrio. Lushnje also has many olive oil trees and is one of the leading olive oil-producing places in Albania.

Subdivisions 

Allkaj, Ballagat, Bubullimë, Dushk, Fier-Shegan, Golem, Hysgjokaj, Karbunarë, Kolonjë, Krutje, Lushnjë.

Economy 

Lushnje is located in the Myzeqe region that is known as a main provider of agricultural products to the rest of the country and for exports to other European Countries, and home to a national Institute of Agricultural Research. During the Communism Regime, the city had factories for paper, plastic, and food processing factories. Lushnje has many olive trees. Many other business involve brick making and marble and also oil distributors and small oil refinery for gas station in and out of the city for the city.

Infrastructure

Education 

Lushnje has many schools from college and to pre-k. The biggest and most famous schools in Lushnje are known as "Skënder Libohova", "18 Tetori" and "Kongresi i Lushnjes". "Kongresi i Lushnjes" has been renovated and is one for the most modern schools in the city with painted sides and interior upgrades. The college that is situated in Lushnje is Institute of Agricultural Research Lushnje about agriculture research. "Foto Puka" is another school in the city that is the second largest one. There are two high schools, one is "18 Tetori" and the other being "Vath Koreshi". The city also has a Professional Public High School, "Hasan D. Gina", with special curriculums raising from informatics to auto-services.

The schools of Lushnje offer a lot of recreation for their students. "Skënder Libohova" school has a new multi-functional park and a basketball and soccer area. "Foto Puka" and "Jani Nushi" are more known for their soccer and volleyball respectively.

Transportation 

There is one highway that passes by the outskirts of Lushnje known as the SH4. The SH4 comes from Durrës to Lushnje, and then to Fier.

There are urban buses through the city with only one straight route. The ride is about 5 km and 13 minutes or less. There are buses available at the train station which can take you from Lushnje to Greece and many places in the country and Balkan region.

Due to the shutdown of trains in Albania during 1990 there have been no signs of trains.

Demography 

Like most southern Albanian regions, the people of Lushnje speak a Tosk dialect. The population is mixed Orthodox and Muslim, typical of southern Albanian cities. Data from the 1918 census shows that the population of Lushnje was split almost evenly between Muslims and Christians at the time of independence from the Ottoman Empire.

Culture

Sport 

KS Lushnja was originally formed in 1927 and the first football game held in the city of Lushnje was played shortly after. This was a friendly game against FK Tomori Berat and the team consisted of young men from Lushnje. The club was named Kongresi i Lushnjës following a proposal from a member of parliament and signatory of the Albanian Declaration of Independence Ferit Vokopola to name the club after the Congress of Lushnje, which was where Vokopola himself was elected secretary. In 1927 a young man named Ali Fuga returned from his studies in Austria and joined the club as a player and the head coach. He returned to Albania from Austria with shirts that would be used by the club, and they had green vertical stripes which were used to symbolise the fields of Myzeqe. Although the club was formed on 21 January 1927 it was not "officially" formed until 27 July 1930 shortly after the formation of the Albanian Football Association a month earlier. It was known then as the Kongresi i Lushnjës literacy-artistic society. The club's first official jerseys were green, and the first sports chief of the club was Ali Fuga, who had been a key member of the club's pre formation years.
In 1945 they changed their name to KS Traktori Lushnja followed by a further name change in 1950 to SK Lushnja. In 1951 it was changed to Puna Lushnja, before they returned to KS Traktori Lushnja in 1958. In 1991 the club was named KF Lushnja.
The club's main supporters' group is called the Ultras Delegatët. Also Lushnje has their own Volleyball team known as Ekipi i Volejbollit të Lushnjes.

Landmarks 
 Abdurrahman Roza Haxhiu Stadium 
 Congress of Lushnjë Museum 
 Ardenica Monastery

Twin towns - Sister cities 

  Brindisi, Italy

Notable people 
Following is a list of notable people born in Lushnja, Albania, or that spent most of their lives in Lushnja:
 Lindita Arapi - Poet, writer
 Artan Bano - Footballer and manager
 Luli Bitri - Actor
 Iljaz Çeço - Footballer
 Rezart Dabulla - Footballer
 Edmond Dalipi - Footballer
 Kristaq Dhamo - Movie director
 Abdurrahman Roza Haxhiu - Footballer
 Vath Koreshi - Writer
 Saimir Malko - Footballer and manager
 Rey Manaj - Footballer 
 Fahredin Nuri - Engineer
 Nebi Efendi Sefa - One of the founding fathers of modern Albania, signed the declaration of independence in 1912
 Ferit bej Vokopola - One of the founding fathers of modern Albania, signed the declaration of independence in 1912
 Margarita Xhepa - Actor
 Vaçe Zela - Singer
 Kastro Zizo - Musician
Florian Marku - Boxer

See also 
Balsha II
Battle of Savra

References

External links 

 
Administrative units of Lushnjë
Cities in Albania
Municipalities in Fier County